Fight the Power: Greatest Hits Live! is a live album by Public Enemy.

Track listing
"Brothers Gonna Work It Out"
"Welcome to the Terrordome"
"Bring the Noise"
"Son of a Bush"
"Shut 'Em Down"
"Black Steel in the Hour of Chaos"
"He Got Game"
"Revolverlution"
"911 Is a Joke"
"Public Enemy No. 1"
"D.J. Lord Solo"
"Give It Up"
"Don't Believe the Hype"
"Rebel Without A Pause"
"Arizona (Ball of Confusion)"
"Fight the Power (Soul Power)"
Source:

References

Public Enemy (band) albums
Public Enemy (band) video albums
2007 live albums
Live video albums
2007 video albums